TSH may refer to:

 Tanzanian shilling, the currency of Tanzania
 Thyroid-stimulating hormone, a family of glycoprotein hormones in vertebrata
 Tsh (trigraph), a trigraph in various alphabets using Latin script
 Tshiuetin Rail Transportation, a Canadian railway, reporting mark
 Tsuvan language, an Afro-Asiatic language of Cameroon, ISO 639-3 code

Places 
 Tai Shui Hang station, Hong Kong, MTR station code
 Topeka State Hospital, Kansas, US
 Tshikapa Airport, Democratic Republic of the Congo, IATA code